Jaunliepāja is one of the neighbourhoods of Liepāja, Latvia.

References

Neighbourhoods in Liepāja